Grand Ayatollah Sayyid Abu al-Hasan al-Musawi al-Isfahani (1861–November 4, 1946) was an Iranian-Iraqi Shia marja'.

al-Isfahani became the leading marja' of the Shia world after the death of Muhammad-Hussein al-Naini.

Biography 
al-Isfahani was born in Madiseh to Sayyid Muhammad al-Isfahani, a renowned alim of Isfahan. 

He passed his preliminary training in Nimarud School in Isfahan and traveled to Najaf in 1890. He joined the lessons of Akhund Khorasani, who soon recognized the talents of his disciple. al-Isfahani received his degree of Ijtihad from Khorasani. After the death of his contemporary scholar, Ayatollah Mirza Hussein Naini, he became as sole Marja' for most of Shia Muslims. Isfahani was banished to Iran for protecting Iraqi Muslims against colonial policies. Also, he had a strong position towards the incidents of the Goharshad Mosque in Mashhad.

al-Isfahani had a grandson named Musa al-Musawi who studied with him for 17 years, Musa al-Musawi was a renowned academic and philosopher, he wrote a revisionist text on Shia Islam where he sought to purify schism from innovation and bring it closer to the majority of Muslims.

Works 
In Fiqh, Wasila al-Naja which due to its comprehensive nature, has been elucidated by many Fuqaha including Ruhollah Khomeini.

Students  

 Musa al-Musawi
 Ayatollah Borqei
 Muhsin al-Hakim
 Mohammad Hadi Milani
 Mirza Hashem Amoli
 Muhammad Husayn Tabataba'i
 Mohammad-Taqi Bahjat Foumani
 Mohammad Shahroudi
 Sayyed Hassan Musavi Bojnourdi 
 Ali Naqi Naqvi

Death 
He died in Kadhimiya in 1946.

See also 

 Lists of Maraji

References 

1860 births
1946 deaths
Iranian grand ayatollahs
Iranian emigrants to Iraq
Twelvers
People from Isfahan Province
Al-Moussawi family
Burials at Imam Ali Mosque
19th-century Iranian people
20th-century Iranian people
Pupils of Muhammad Kadhim Khorasani